Otto Freundlich (10 July 1878 – 9 March 1943) was a German painter and sculptor of Jewish origin. A part of the first generation of abstract painters in Western art, Freundlich was a great admirer of cubism. He was murdered at Majdanek concentration camp during the Holocaust.

Life

Freundlich was born in Stolp, Province of Pomerania, Prussia. His mother was a first cousin of the writer Samuel Lublinski. Otto studied dentistry before deciding to become an artist. He went to Paris in 1908, living in Montmartre in Bateau Lavoir near to Pablo Picasso, Braque and others. In 1914 he returned to Germany. After World War I, he became politically active as a member of the November Group. In 1919, he organized the first Dada - exhibition in Cologne with Max Ernst and Johannes Theodor Baargeld. In 1925, he joined the Abstraction-Création group.

After 1925, Freundlich lived and worked mainly in France. In Germany, his work was condemned by the Nazis as degenerate and removed from public display. Some works were seized and displayed at the infamous Nazi exhibition of degenerate art including his monumental sculpture Der Neue Mensch (The New Human) which was photographed unsympathetically and used as the cover illustration of the exhibition catalogue. Der Neue Mensch was never recovered and is assumed to have been destroyed. One of his sculptures was recovered in an excavation in Berlin and put on display at the Neues Museum.

While in Paris, he became a member of the Union des Artistes Allemands Libres.

He moved to France in 1924, and during the occupation moved with his wife to the Pyrenees. Freundlich was interned by the Vichy authorities but released, for a time, under the influence of Pablo Picasso. In 1943 he was arrested and deported to Majdanek Concentration Camp, where he was murdered on the day he arrived.

Legacy 
Although Otto Freundlich has been largely overlooked since being vilified by the Nazis, a documentary Das Geht Nur Langsam (It Takes Time) was released in 2012. The film traces his vision to build streets of sculptures running through Europe symbolizing his utopian ideas for a world society. In Stolp there is bust erected in memory of Otto Freundlich.

Gallery

See also
 List of German painters

References

External links

A Forcing of Barriers - A staged encounter between Freundlich and Nazi sculptor, Arno Breker, conceived by Per-Oskar Leu for the online magazine, Triple Canopy.
 Biographic Details
 Das Geht Nur Langsam (It Takes Time) Documentary Film.

1878 births
1943 deaths
Abstract painters
People from Słupsk
German Jews who died in the Holocaust
19th-century German painters
19th-century German male artists
German male painters
20th-century German painters
Jewish painters
Modern painters
People who died in Majdanek concentration camp
People from the Province of Pomerania
German civilians killed in World War II
German people executed in Nazi concentration camps
Executed people from Pomeranian Voivodeship
20th-century German sculptors
20th-century German male artists
German male sculptors
19th-century sculptors
People of Montmartre